Lock Up is a 2020 Indian Tamil-language mystery thriller film written and directed by SG Charles in his directorial debut and produced by Nithin Sathya. The film stars Vaibhav, Vani Bhojan, Venkat Prabhu, and Poorna, while Easwari Rao and Mime Gopi play supporting roles. It was released on 14 August on ZEE5.

Plot 
Ilavarasi, a police inspector, sets out to investigate the murder of a fellow colleague. However, the evidence appears to be fabricated and suggests involvement of someone from her own department.

Cast 
 Vaibhav as Vasanth
 Vani Bhojan as Meena
 Venkat Prabhu as Moorthy
 Poorna as Malliga
 Easwari Rao as Inspector Illavarasi
Mime Gopi as Sampath
Poraali Dileepan as Malliga's husband
 Dileepan as the new inspector (cameo appearance)

Production 
The film production began in 2019 and was supposed to be the feature film debut of television actress Vani Bhojan; however, Meeku Maathrame Cheptha (2019) ended up releasing first. The film is produced by actor Nithin Sathya and is about two corrupt policemen played by Vaibhav and Venkat Prabhu. Nithin Sathya had previously worked with Vaibhav and Venkat Prabhu in Chennai 600028 II. The title Lock Up was chosen because the film is about a police lock-up and is based on several true incidents. This venture was promoted as the first film in which Vaibhav plays a police officer although he played a police officer in Taana (2020). Venkat Prabhu portrays the antagonist for the first time in his career.

Soundtrack

Release 
Lock Up was released on 14 August 2020 on the over-the-top (OTT) media service ZEE5. It was initially scheduled for a theatrical release in November 2019 after post-production work had been completed. However, the delay of the film and subsequent COVID-19 pandemic meant that the theatrical release was dropped in favour of an OTT release.

Reception 
The Times of India gave the film a rating of three out of five stars and noted that "A positive factor is the lack of unnecessary deviation from the main plot and the way unsolved sub-plots are connected in the latter half". Hindustan Times wrote that "Lock Up is a praiseworthy attempt in the investigative thriller space. It’s also one of the better Tamil films among the recent direct OTT releases. Even though the writing is amateurish at places, you don’t nitpick because the film never gets outright boring and manages to keep us engaged".

References

External links 

2020 direct-to-video films
2020 directorial debut films
2020 films
2020 thriller films
2020s mystery thriller films
2020s Tamil-language films
Films not released in theaters due to the COVID-19 pandemic
Indian mystery thriller films
ZEE5 original films